Haim Liebel (21 December 1922 – 21 January 2022) was an Israeli naval engineer.

Life and career 
Shahal was born in Tel Aviv, the son of Shlomo Liebel. In his education, he was trained as an electrical engineer. In 1946, Shahal served in the Palmach elite fighting force, in which he commanded and planned on the Haganah venture Night of the Bridges. He served in the Israeli Defense Forces, discharged in 1970 in the rank of lieutenant colonel. Shahal was initially drafted to work with the naval squadrons in Jaffa. He later served as an engineering officer in the Israeli Navy. In his final capacity, from 1968, Shahal headed the development unit of the Israeli Navy.

In 1970, Shahal became chief engineer for the Israel Shipyards. He was awarded the Israel Defense Prize, by the President of Israel in 1973. Shahal was also honored for an award, alongside Royal Danish Air Force commissioned officer major Viggo Dan Nielsen.  With his contributions, he created missile ships.

Shahal died on 21 January 2022, at the age of 99.

References 

1922 births
2022 deaths
20th-century Israeli engineers
People from Tel Aviv
Israeli engineers
Israel Defense Prize recipients
Israeli officers
Israeli Navy personnel